"The Lonely" is a song by British Sea Power. The song was the group's third single and their second on Rough Trade. It was their first single to garner much press coverage and resulted in a pleasing chart position. Unusually, the nominal a-side actually features as the flipside on both versions. The main position is taken by "The Spirit of St. Louis", a tale of Charles Lindbergh's flight across the Atlantic. This is still regularly performed live despite it only appearing on this release. The title track was written as a tribute to Geoff Goddard, a friend of the band who wrote the 1960s number-one single, "Johnny Remember Me".

The single reached number 76 on the UK Singles Chart.

Track listings

CD
(RTRADESCD048)
 "The Spirit of St. Louis" (Yan/BSP) – 3:56
 "The Lonely" (Yan/BSP) – 5:03
 "No Red Indian" (Hamilton/BSP) – 3:54

7" Vinyl 
(RTRADES048)
 "The Spirit of St. Louis" (Yan/BSP) – 3:56
 "The Lonely" (Yan/BSP) – 5:03

References

External links
 Official website
 "The Lonely" at Salty Water (fansite)

British Sea Power songs
2002 singles
2002 songs
Rough Trade Records singles